Kyle Andrew Wealleans (born 2 May 1969) is a former New Zealand cricketer who played 43 first-class cricket matches for Northern Districts in his career. He was born in Matamata.

References

1969 births
Living people
New Zealand cricketers
Northern Districts cricketers
People from Morrinsville
Cricketers from Waikato